ULMA Handling Systems is a material handling and logistics automation company, supplier of automated storage and retrieval systems, based in Oñati, Spain. The company engineers design,   produce, and install material handling systems in   installations, from small warehouses to complex systems.

Corporate information 
The firm has operational subsidiaries in several countries 
 ULMA Handling Systems Polinyà (Barcelona), Spain
 ULMA Handling Systems Aldaia (Valencia), Spain
 ULMA Handling Systems Serris, France
 ULMA Handling Systems Arnhem, Netherlands
 ULMA Handling Systems São Paulo, Brazil
 ULMA Handling Systems Lima, Perú
 ULMA Handling Systems Las Condes (Santiago), Chile

History 
ULMA Handling Systems is one of the 8 companies which make up ULMA Group, which dates back to 1957 when six young mechanics set up a small workshop in Oñati (Guipúzcoa). In 1988 was founded ULMA Handling Systems, after a technology transfer agreement was signed with the Japanese company Daifuku for the sale and introduction of automatic material handling.

In 1997, the company broke into overseas markets installing warehouses in Brazil, France and Italy and nowadays has subsidiaries in Spain, France, Netherlands, Brazil, Chile and Peru.

Products and services 
The company designs material handling systems involving automatic movements of the products, improving the productivity rates and the efficiency of the warehouses.

The company develops order picking solutions, automated storage and retrieval systems (AS/RS), conveyor and automated guided vehicles, automated sorting solutions and end of line solutions. ULMA Handling Systems offers from logistics consulting, planning, design to after sales service.

In addition, the company provides warehouse management software which guarantees the optimization and optimum control of all the movements of the goods that are located into the warehouse. 
It also offers baggage handling solutions, designing and developing integral solutions and health logistics solutions, such as storage of medication and its dispensing.

References 

Logistics companies of Spain